Clinker Bluff is a detached bluff within the Skelton Glacier, due west of Mount Tricouni. It was surveyed in 1957 by the New Zealand party of the Commonwealth Trans-Antarctic Expedition (1956–58) and so named because it resembles the shape of a clinker, a rectangular nail used in alpine boots, and because of its association with nearby Mount Tricouni.

References
 

Cliffs of the Ross Dependency
Hillary Coast